Nadine Muriel, Countess of Shrewsbury (née Crofton-Atkins;  24 January 1913 – 19 February 2003), known professionally as Nadine Talbot and later as Nadine Credi, was an English opera soprano and the first wife of John Chetwynd-Talbot, 21st Earl of Shrewsbury (1914–1980). They married in 1936.

Biography
Her father was Brigadier-General Cyril Randell Crofton-Atkins, of Crediton, and her mother was Mary Ruth Josephine Emily Lyne Evans, daughter of Arthur Henry Lyne Evans.

She promoted two seasons of Opera at Ingestre in 1957 and 1958, an opera festival at Ingestre Hall, the couple's home.  She was one of a series of society beauties photographed as classical figures by Madame Yevonde.

Lord Shrewsbury sued for divorce in 1958, claiming that Nadine had been sexually involved with their daughter's tutor, Anthony Lowther, but in 1959 judge Charles A. Collingwood rejected the divorce suit, finding that Lord Shrewsbury had committed adultery with Nina Mortlock. In a subsequent proceeding, a divorce was granted. Lord Shrewsbury's second wife was Nina Mortlock.

Lady Shrewsbury died in Bedford, Bedfordshire, in 2003.

Family

Nadine and Lord Shrewsbury had six children. They had four daughters before the birth of an heir, Charles. He succeeded to the earldoms in 1980.

Lady Charlotte Sarah Alexandra Chetwynd-Talbot (born 1938), married Camillo Cavazza dei Conti Cavazza, son of Count Alessandro Cavazza of Isola del Garda and Princess Livia Borghese; has seven children
Lady (Josephine) Sylvia-Rose Chetwynd-Talbot (born 1940), married Stafford Antony Saint; three children
Lady Catherine Laura Chetwynd-Talbot (born 1945), married Richard Sebastian Endicott Chamberlain; has three children
Lady Marguerite Mary Chetwynd-Talbot (born 1950), married Guy William Brisbane; one child
Charles Henry John Benedict Crofton Chetwynd Chetwynd-Talbot, Viscount Ingestre (born 1952), married Deborah Jane Hutchinson; has three children
Hon. Paul Anthony Alexander Bueno Chetwynd-Talbot (born 1957); married Sarah Elizabeth Bradley, granddaughter of Thomas Brand, 3rd Viscount Hampden; has three children

References

1913 births
2003 deaths
20th-century British women opera singers
English countesses
Waterford
20th-century English nobility